Onasanya is a surname. Notable people with this surname include:

Bisi Onasanya (born 1961),  former Group Managing Director and Chief Executive Officer of First Bank of Nigeria
Fiona Onasanya (born 1983), Independent politician and former Member of Parliament for Peterborough